From the Depths of Dreams is the debut EP by American rock band Senses Fail. It was recorded at Nada Engineering Studio in New Windsor, New York, with John Naclerio and the band acting as producers. Naclerio served as engineer and mixed the EP, before it was mastered by Steven Marcussen at Marcussen Mastering in Hollywood, California. Only 300 copies were originally released by ECA Records on August 16, 2002, and so it was released with new artwork and two bonus tracks on April 29, 2003 on Drive-Thru Records.

The tracks "One Eight Seven" and "Bloody Romance" were released on Senses Fail's greatest hits album Follow Your Bliss: The Best Of Senses Fail.
The EP was re-recorded with the current lineup in 2019 and released as the "re-imagined" version.

Track listing
All music by Senses Fail, all lyrics by Buddy Nielsen.

 "Steven" – 4:25
 "Free Fall Without a Parachute" – 4:17
 "Bloody Romance" – 3:55
 "Dreaming a Reality" – 5:00
 "The Ground Folds" – 4:00
 "One Eight Seven" – 4:16

Bonus tracks
In addition to the first six tracks, the Drive-Thru Records re-release of the CD featured the following:
 "Handguns and Second Chances" – 2:21
 "The Ground Folds (Acoustic)" – 4:30

Personnel
Personnel per booklet.

Senses Fail
 Buddy Nielsen – lead vocals
 Garrett Zablocki – guitar
 Dave Miller – guitar
 Dan Trapp – drums
 Mike Glita – bass

Production
 John Naclerio – producer, engineer, mixing
 Senses Fail – producer
 Steve Marcussen – mastering
 Francisco Enciso – illustrations
 Joshua M. Ortega –  design, layout

Chart performance

References

External links

From the Depths of Dreams at YouTube (streamed copy where licensed)

Senses Fail EPs
2002 debut EPs
Drive-Thru Records EPs